Simon Sweeney is an English author and lecturer in international political economy and business based at the University of York.

Lecturing
Sweeney (PhD, Leeds) is a Reader in International Political Economy and Business at the York Management School, University of York where he was Director of Postgraduate Programmes from 2012 to 2019. He is a Senior Fellow of the UK Higher Education Academy (SFHEA). He is a member of the University of York Learning and Teaching Forum. He was formerly at Sheffield Business School, Sheffield Hallam University, and York St. John University.

Writing
Sweeney's writing includes work in different disciplines. He has written a politics text book for Longman, 'Europe, the State and Globalisation', as well as chapters in edited collections. He has also worked as both an author and co-author, producing text books in English language teaching, with a particular interest in communication skills for adult learners working in business and professional environments. These include works on management, marketing and finance for business management students and professionals.

On 12 January 2013 a letter from Sweeney was published by the Guardian newspaper containing data relating to benefits arising from the United Kingdom's membership of the European Union, and the former European Communities, constituting an ingredient for debate over the forthcoming referendum on the nature of Britain's membership of the EU. This letter was subsequently quoted in a speech by Olli Rehn, then Vice-President of the European Commission. The letter re-surfaced during the 2016 referendum campaign on UK membership of the European Union and went viral with over 100,000 shares.

He has written a number of articles on the EU/UK/Brexit issue on the academic current affairs website The Conversation. He has made various contributions to two EU-related thinktanks, UK in a Changing Europe (King's College London) and the DCU Brexit Institute (Dublin City University). These are accessible below under Commentary articles.

He has written reports on the internationalisation of higher education, especially in relation to the European Higher Education Area and the Bologna Process. These reports are available from the Higher Education Academy.

Other work
Between 2006 and 2013 Simon Sweeney was one of 14 UK Bologna Experts. The Bologna Process aims to create the European Higher Education Area by making academic degree standards and quality assurance standards more comparable and compatible throughout Europe.

He obtained his PhD at the University of Leeds, with a thesis on 'EU Common Security and Defence Policy: Power, bureaucratic politics and Grand Strategy'. He has longstanding research interests in the European Union and the integration process. His published research is primarily on EU security and defence policy, where he has a particular interest in the Western Balkans.

He is a Senior Fellow and an Associate of the Higher Education Academy (AdvanceHE/HEA), with specialist expertise in the internationalisation of higher education, internationalisation strategy, and the Bologna Process. He is available for consultancy work in these areas.

He is a Certified Management and Business Educator (CMBE) through the Chartered Association of Business Schools (CABS). He has published widely on Higher Education and internationalisation, student mobility, and the student experience, as well as on various aspects of teaching and learning practice.

Fellowships and projects
 2019 Senior Fellowship Higher Education Academy
 2006 National Teaching Fellowship (Higher Education Academy)
 2006–13 UK Bologna Expert (UK Socrates Erasmus Council and British Council, European Commission-funded)
 2008–09 Sounds Good JISC-funded audio feedback project led by Bob Rotheram at Leeds Metropolitan University (with Newman University College and Northampton University)
 2007–09 C4C CETL Team Fellowship – Project Leader Enabling e-Learning: creativity in Virtual Space (EEL) External partners: National Association of Writers in Education, Wimba Educational Software.
 1997–2004: English365 initiator, partner, and co-author of 3-level professional/business English course, English365, Cambridge University Press
 1995–2001 Jean Monnet Scholar; Jean Monnet Project EC-funded Module development contributing to teaching and learning about European integration; three modules.
 1995–98 Partner in international European Commission-funded Socrates Lingua Project: Handbook of Courses for Teachers of Modern Foreign Languages
 1998–2000 Partner in international European Commission-funded Socrates Lingua Project: Using ICT in Foreign Language Teaching

Selected publications
Sweeney, S, and Winn, N. (2021) ‘Do or Die? The UK, the EU and internal/external security cooperation after Brexit’ European Political Science. ECPR/Palgrave Macmillan. http://link.springer.com/article/10.1057/s41304-021-00322-0
Sweeney, S and Winn, N. (2020) ‘EU security and defence cooperation in times of dissent: analysing PESCO, the European Defence Fund and the European Intervention Initiative (EI2) in the shadow of Brexit’ Defence Studies 20(3) 224-249. https://doi.org/10.1080/14702436.2020.1778472
Sweeney, S. (2019) ‘Europeanisation and the transformation of EU security policy: post-cold war developments in the common security and defence policy’ European Security. Book Review. DOI: 10.1080/09662839.2019.1656608
Sweeney, S. (2018) ‘The European Union and EUFOR Althea’s contribution to a dysfunctional peace in Bosnia and Herzegovina: bureaucratic politics, emergent strategy? Journal of Regional Security 13(1) 3-38.
Sweeney, S. and Winn, N. (2017) ‘CSDP and the Open Method of Coordination: Developing the EU’s Comprehensive Approach to Security’ Journal of Regional Security. 12(2) 95-121.
Sweeney, S. (2016) Europe, the State and Globalisation London: Routledge (re-edition)
Sweeney, S. (2013) 'Making European Monetary Union Work' Book Review International Affairs 89(3) May
Wickham, M., Dunn, A., & Sweeney, S. (2012) 'Analysis of the leading tourism journals 1999-2008' Annals of Tourism Research, 39(3) 1714-18
Sweeney, S. (2011) 'Reconstructing Spain: cultural heritage and memory after civil war' (Book review) International Journal of Heritage Studies, 17(6) 629–631.
Sweeney, S. (2007) ‘9/11 disorder and the European response: the values of international society’, in U. Beitter, (ed) Reflections on Europe in Transition Peter Lang Publishing, New York
Sweeney, S. (2007) ‘Globalization, Multiple threats and the weakness of international institutions: a community-based response’ in C. Clay, M. Madden and L. Potts (eds.) Towards understanding community: People and places Palgrave Macmillan, Basingstoke.
Sweeney, S. (2005) Europe, the State and Globalisation Longman, Harlow.

Sweeney worked as an author and co-author in the field of ELT with Cambridge University Press, Longman, Penguin, Prentice Hall International and Harper Collins, producing over thirty titles between 1994 and 2011. The most successful of these was English for Business Communication (1997, 2002 CUP) and Communicating in Business (2000, 2004, CUP). He was a co-author on the three level series, English 365 (2004, CUP).

Footnotes

English political writers
Year of birth missing (living people)
Living people
Academics of the University of York
Senior Fellows of the Higher Education Academy